André Testut (13 April 1926, Lyon – 24 September 2005, Lyon) was a French-born racing driver and team owner from Monaco.

Career
Testut's debut in racing took place at the beginning of September 1956 at the Course de Cote de Vuillafans-Echevanne in France, driving an O.S.C.A. MT4 roadster where he finished second. This was followed up with a 3rd-place finish at the wheel of a Porsche 356 at the Coupe d’Automne toward the end of September.

In 1957 Testut partnered with his compatriot Louis Chiron for the 24th edition of the Mille Miglia. The two raced a Citroen DS19 under the monicker Montecarlo Team and finished in 103rd place.

Testut's victory at the Vuillafans-Echevannes sport car event in 1957 earned him a congratulatory letter from the Maserati brothers, who had formed OSCA after being forced out of their company bearing their name.

Testut entered 2 Formula One World Championship Grands Prix, both in Monaco, in 1958 and 1959. On both occasions he drove his Maserati 250F and both times he failed to qualify. In 1958 he also entered a car for Chiron. For both drivers it would be their last attempt to race in Monaco. Testut performed better at the 1958 Syracuse Grand Prix when he retired with engine failure when he was running seventh with ten laps to go.

Complete Formula One World Championship results
(key)

Complete Formula One Non-Championship results
(key) (Races in bold indicate pole position)
(Races in italics indicate fastest lap)

References

External links
 Profile on OldRacingCars.com

Monegasque racing drivers
Monegasque Formula One drivers
Formula One team owners
Formula One team principals
French racing drivers
1926 births
2005 deaths
Sportspeople from Lyon
24 Hours of Le Mans drivers
World Sportscar Championship drivers